Lythrum is a genus of 38 species of flowering plants native to the temperate world. Commonly known as loosestrife (a name they share with Lysimachia, which are not closely related), they are among 32 genera of the family Lythraceae.

Description
They are herbaceous annuals or perennials. Typically they have square stems, narrow stalkless leaves, and spikes of star-shaped flowers in shades of purple, pink and white. They are especially associated with boggy areas, river banks and ponds, though in cultivation they often tolerate drier conditions. The species L. salicaria (purple loosestrife) and L. virgatum are found in cultivation.

Selected species
Species include:

Formerly placed here

Cuphea carthagenensis (Jacq.) J.F.Macbr. (as L. carthagenense Jacq.)
Cuphea melanium (L.) R.Br. ex Steud. (as L. melanium L.)
Cuphea parsonsia (L.) R.Br. ex Steud. (as L. parsonsia L.)
Cuphea racemosa subsp. racemosa (as L. racemosum L.f.)
Cuphea viscosissima Jacq. (as L. petiolatum L.)
Pleurophora anomala (A. St.-Hil.) Koehne (as L. anomalum A.St.-Hil.)
Woodfordia fruticosa (L.) Kurz (as L. fruticosum L.)

Morphology
Some species of Lythrum are heterostylous, such as the tristylous (occurring in three forms) L. salicaria.

Ecology
Lythrum species are used as food plants by the larvae of some Lepidoptera species, including the small emperor moth, the engrailed, the Hebrew character, and the V-pug.

As a noxious weed in the United States
The genus Lythrum is listed as a noxious weed in Michigan, North Carolina, and Wisconsin.

Fossil record
So far the oldest evidence of Lythrum is fossil pollen from the early Campanian, 82-81 Ma of Wyoming.

References

 
Lythraceae genera